Steven Vidler may refer to:

 Steven Vidler (actor) (born 1960), Australian actor
 Steven Vidler (judoka) (born 1977), Scottish judoka